Hélène Tétreault (born August 22, 1958) is a former Canadian handball player who competed in the 1976 Summer Olympics.

Born in Granby, Quebec, Tétreault was part of the Canadian handball team, which finished sixth in the Olympic tournament. She played three matches and scored five goals.

References
 profile

1958 births
Canadian female handball players
Handball players at the 1976 Summer Olympics
Living people
Olympic handball players of Canada
People from Granby, Quebec
Sportspeople from Quebec
French Quebecers